The Thebaid or Thebais (Thēbaïs) was a region in ancient Egypt, comprising the 13 southernmost nomes of Upper Egypt, from Abydos to Aswan.

Pharaonic history 

The Thebaid acquired its name from its proximity to the ancient Egyptian capital of Thebes (Luxor). During the Ancient Egyptian dynasties this region was dominated by Thebes and its priesthood at the temple of Amun at Karnak.

In Ptolemaic Egypt, the Thebaid formed a single administrative district under the Epistrategos of Thebes, who was also responsible for overseeing navigation in the Red Sea and the Indian Ocean. The capital of Ptolemaic Thebaid was Ptolemais Hermiou, a Hellenistic colony on the Nile which served as the center of royal political and economic control in Upper Egypt.

Roman province(s) 
During the Roman Empire, Diocletian created the province of Thebais, guarded by the legions I Maximiana Thebanorum and II Flavia Constantia. This was later divided into Upper (Anō Thēbaïs), comprising the southern half with its capital at Thebes, and Lower or Nearer (Thēbaïs Engistē), comprising the northern half with capital at Ptolemais.

Around the 5th century, since it was a desert, the Thebaid became a place of  retreat of a number of Christian hermits, and was the birthplace of Pachomius.  In Christian art, the Thebaid was represented as a place with numerous monks.

Episcopal sees 
Ancient episcopal sees of Thebais Prima (Thebaid I) listed in the Annuario Pontificio as Catholic titular sees:
 Antaeopolis (Tjebu)
 Antinoöpolis, the Metropolitan Archbishopric
 Apollonopolis Parva (Côm-Esfaht, now Qus)
 Cusae
 Hermopolis Magna = Maior
 Hypselis (Chutb = Shutb)
 Oasis Magna (Kharga Oasis)
 Panopolis (Akhmim)

Ancient episcopal sees of Thebais Secunda (Thebaid II) listed in the Annuario Pontificio as Catholic titular sees:

See also 
 List of Catholic dioceses in Egypt

References

Sources and external links 
 
 GCatholic - (Current, Titular and) Defunct sees in Egypt

Roman provinces in Africa
Roman Egypt
Byzantine Egypt
Geography of ancient Egypt
Late Roman provinces
293 establishments
290s establishments in the Roman Empire
3rd-century establishments in Egypt
290s
640s disestablishments in the Byzantine Empire
641 disestablishments
7th-century disestablishments in Egypt
640s disestablishments